Baby Records or Baby Record may refer to:

Baby Records (Italy), an Italian record label
 Baby Records, record label of the Virgin Prunes
Rourke Baby Record, a medical guideline for pediatrics

See also
Birth certificate